Delisle or De Lisle may refer to:

Alexandre-Maurice Delisle (1810–1880), Canadian businessman, political figure
Arthur Delisle (1859–1936), Canadian political figure, author
Charles-Marie-René Leconte de Lisle (1818–1894), French poet of the Parnassian movement
Claude Delisle (1644–1720), French cartographer and royal censor, father of Guillaume (q.v.)
Claude Joseph Rouget de Lisle (1760–1836), author of La Marseillaise, the French national anthem
Dan Delisle (b. 1976), Canadian athlete in ice hockey
Esther Delisle (born 1954), Canadian historian
Georges-Isidore Delisle (1856–1920), Canadian political figure
François Delisle (b. 1967), Canadian film producer, actor, musician
 Gilles Delisle and Helga Delisle were killed in the Delisle triple murder in 2010
Grey DeLisle (born 1973), U.S. singer & voice actress
Guillaume Delisle (1675–1726), French cartographer
Guy Delisle (born 1966), Canadian comic book author
Heather De Lisle (born 1976), American television presenter, radio correspondent
Jacques Delisle (b. 1935), Canadian lawyer, judge
Jean-Baptiste-Claude Delisle de Sales (1741–1816), French natural philosopher
Jeanne-Mance Delisle (b. 1941), Canadian writer (some sources list YOB as 1939)
Jeffrey Delisle (b. 1971), Canadian naval officer, implicated in Russian intelligence leaks
John Delisle (1871–1940), Canadian political figure
Jonathan Delisle (1977–2006) Canadian hockey player
Joseph-Nicolas Delisle (1688–1768), French astronomer for whom the lunar features as well as the temperature scale below are named
Leanda de Lisle, British writer and journalist
Léopold Victor Delisle (1826–1910), French historian
Louis Nelson Delisle (1885–1949), U.S. musician in jazz
Margaret Delisle (b. 1946), Canadian political figure
Michael Delisle (b. 1959), Canadian author
Peter Delisle (1934–2014), English athlete in cricket
Raymond Delisle (1943–2013), French athlete in bicycle racing
Roseline Delisle (1952–2003), Canadian ceramic artist
Steven Delisle (b. 1990), Canadian athlete in ice hockey
Vanessa de Lisle, British fashion journalist
Xavier Delisle (b. 1977), Canadian athlete in ice hockey

Several titles "de Lisle" has been held by various Englishmen, see:
Lord Lisle (disambiguation)
Viscount Lisle
Viscount De L'Isle
Baron Lisle

French-language surnames